Katie Howard may refer to:

The lead in the 1950 film Comanche Territory
A character on That '80s Show

See also
Kate Howard, fictional character in General Hospital
Kat Howard
Kate Howarde
Kathy Howard (born 1958), American artistic gymnast
Catherine Howard (disambiguation)